Wanganeen is a surname. Notable people with the surname include:

Derick Wanganeen (born 1991), Australian rules footballer 
Gavin Wanganeen (born 1973), Australian rules footballer
Natasha Wanganeen, Aboriginal Australian actress
Tex Wanganeen, (born 2003), Australian rules footballer